is a 1995 video game developed by SIMS Co., Ltd. and published by Sega for the Game Gear and Master System system. A unofficial fan translation to English was released on January 2, 2019 and 20 April 2020. A Mega Drive version was planned but never released. The game was released at the same time as the final film of the Heisei period, Godzilla vs. Destoroyah.

Gameplay 
Godzilla: Kaijuu no Daishingeki is a turn-based strategy game with some fighting game elements. A player can play as Godzilla or similar monsters, or as the G-Force, a human defense force. Those have monster killing tools such as tanks, artillery and planes. Some monsters are unplayable enemies and both sides will have the chance to fight against them. In the strategy part of the game, the player can move units on the map, and attack enemies. When an enemy is attacked, the game enters an arcade-like fighting game mode. When all units have used their actions points a turn ends.

References

1995 video games
Game Gear games
Game Gear-only games
Godzilla games
Strategy video games
SIMS Co., Ltd. games
Sega video games
Single-player video games
Video games developed in Japan